The following outline is provided as an overview of and topical guide to Saint Barthelemy:

The Collectivity of Saint Barthélemy is an overseas collectivity of France located in the Leeward Islands in the Caribbean Sea.  Also known as Saint Barth in French, or St. Barts in English, the collectivity is one of the four French territories in the Leeward Islands that comprise the French West Indies, and it is the only one to have historically been a Swedish colony.

General reference 

 Pronunciation:
 Common English country names:  Saint Barthélemy, Saint Barth, or Saint Barts
 Official English country name:  The French Overseas Collectivity of Saint Barthélemy
 Common endonym(s):  
 Official endonym(s):  
 Adjectival(s): Barthélemoise
 Demonym(s): Barthélemoise
 Etymology: Name of Saint Barthélemy
 ISO country codes:  BL, BLM, 652
 ISO region codes:  See ISO 3166-2:BL
 Internet country code top-level domain:  .bl

Geography of Saint Barthelemy 

 Saint Barthelemy is: an island, and an overseas collectivity of France
 Location:
 Northern Hemisphere and Western Hemisphere
 North America (though not on the mainland)
 Atlantic Ocean
 North Atlantic
 Caribbean (West Indies)
 Antilles
 Lesser Antilles
 Leeward Islands
 French West Indies
 Time zone:  Eastern Caribbean Time (UTC-04)
 Extreme points of Saint Barthelemy
 High:  Morne du Vitet 
 Low:  Caribbean Sea 0 m
 Land boundaries:  none
 Coastline:  Caribbean Sea
 Population of Saint Barthélemy: 

 Area of Saint Barthélemy: 21 km2
 Atlas of Saint Barthelemy

Environment of Saint Barthelemy 

 Climate of Saint Barthélemy
 Renewable energy in Saint Barthelemy
 Geology of Saint Barthelemy
 Protected areas of Saint Barthelemy
 Biosphere reserves in Saint Barthelemy
 National parks of Saint Barthelemy
 Wildlife of Saint Barthelemy
 Fauna of Saint Barthelemy
 Birds of Saint Barthelemy
 Mammals of Saint Barthelemy

Natural geographic features of Saint Barthelemy 

 Fjords of Saint Barthelemy
 Glaciers of Saint Barthelemy
 Islands of Saint Barthelemy
 Lakes of Saint Barthelemy
 Mountains of Saint Barthelemy
 Volcanoes in Saint Barthelemy
 Rivers of Saint Barthelemy
 Waterfalls of Saint Barthelemy
 Valleys of Saint Barthelemy
 World Heritage Sites in Saint Barthelemy: None

Regions of Saint Barthelemy 

Regions of Saint Barthelemy

Ecoregions of Saint Barthelemy 

List of ecoregions in Saint Barthelemy
 Ecoregions in Saint Barthelemy

Demography of Saint Barthelemy

Government and politics of Saint Barthelemy 

Politics of Saint Barthelemy
 Form of government:
 Capital of Saint Barthelemy: Gustavia
 Elections in Saint Barthelemy
 Political parties in Saint Barthelemy

Branches of the government of Saint Barthelemy 

Government of Saint Barthelemy

Executive branch of the government of Saint Barthelemy 
 Head of state: President of Saint Barthelemy,
 Head of government: Prime Minister of Saint Barthelemy,
 Cabinet of Saint Barthelemy

Legislative branch of the government of Saint Barthelemy 

 Parliament of Saint Barthelemy (bicameral)
 Upper house: Senate of Saint Barthelemy
 Lower house: House of Commons of Saint Barthelemy

Judicial branch of the government of Saint Barthelemy 

Court system of Saint Barthelemy
 Supreme Court of Saint Barthelemy

Foreign relations of Saint Barthelemy 

Foreign relations of Saint Barthelemy
 Diplomatic missions in Saint Barthelemy
 Diplomatic missions of Saint Barthelemy
 France-Saint Barthelemy relations

International organization membership 
The Collectivity of Saint Barthélemy is a member of:
Universal Postal Union (UPU)
World Federation of Trade Unions (WFTU)

Law and order in Saint Barthelemy 

Law of Saint Barthelemy
 Constitution of Saint Barthelemy
 Crime in Saint Barthelemy
 Human rights in Saint Barthelemy
 LGBT rights in Saint Barthelemy
 Freedom of religion in Saint Barthelemy
 Law enforcement in Saint Barthelemy

Military of Saint Barthelemy 

Military of Saint Barthelemy
 Command
 Commander-in-chief:
 Ministry of Defence of Saint Barthelemy
 Forces
 Army of Saint Barthelemy
 Navy of Saint Barthelemy
 Air Force of Saint Barthelemy
 Special forces of Saint Barthelemy
 Military history of Saint Barthelemy
 Military ranks of Saint Barthelemy

Local government in Saint Barthelemy 

Local government in Saint Barthelemy

History of Saint Barthelemy 

 Military history of Saint Barthelemy

Culture of Saint Barthelemy 

Culture of Saint Barthelemy
 Architecture of Saint Barthelemy
 Cuisine of Saint Barthélemy
 Festivals in Saint Barthelemy
 Languages of Saint Barthélemy
 Media in Saint Barthelemy
 National symbols of Sainté Barthelemy
 Coat of arms of Saint Barthelemy
 Flag of Saint Barthelemy
 National anthem of Saint Barthélemy
 People of Saint Barthelemy
 Public holidays in Saint Barthelemy
 Records of Saint Barthelemy
 Religion in Saint Barthelemy
 Christianity in Saint Barthelemy
 Hinduism in Saint Barthélemy
 Islam in Saint Barthelemy
 Judaism in Saint Barthelemy
 Sikhism in Saint Barthelemy
 World Heritage Sites in Saint Barthelemy: None

Art in Saint Barthelemy 
 Art in Saint Barthelemy
 Cinema of Saint Barthelemy
 Literature of Saint Barthelemy
 Music of Saint Barthelemy
 Television in Saint Barthélemy
 Theatre in Saint Barthelemy

Sports in Saint Barthelemy 

Sports in Saint Barthelemy
 Football in Saint Barthélemy
 Saint Barthelemy at the Olympics

Economy and infrastructure of Saint Barthelemy 

 Economic rank, by nominal GDP (2007):
 Agriculture in Saint Barthelemy
 Banking in Saint Barthelemy
 National Bank of Saint Barthelemy
 Communications in Saint Barthelemy
 Internet in Saint Barthelemy
 Companies of Saint Barthelemy
Currency of Saint Barthélemy: Euro (see also: Euro topics)
ISO 4217: EUR
 Energy in Saint Barthelemy
 Energy policy of Saint Barthelemy
 Oil industry in Saint Barthelemy
 Mining in Saint Barthelemy
 Tourism in Saint Barthélemy
 Transport in Saint Barthélemy
 Saint Barthelemy Stock Exchange

Education in Saint Barthelemy 

Education in Saint Barthelemy

Infrastructure of Saint Barthelemy
 Health care in Saint Barthelemy
 Transportation in Saint Barthélemy
 Airports in Saint Barthelemy
 Rail transport in Saint Barthelemy
 Roads in Saint Barthelemy
 Water supply and sanitation in Saint Barthelemy

See also 

Index of Saint Barthélemy-See also
List of international rankings
List of Saint Barthélemy-related topics
Outline of France
Outline of geography
Outline of North America
Outline of the Caribbean

References

Bibliography 
Mémoire St Barth : Comprehensive bibliography about the island

External links 

 Government
Collectivity of Saint Barthélemy (Official government website) 
Comité Territorial du Tourisme (Tourism board website) 
 Historical and botanical information
Mémoire St Barth : Saint-Barthelemy's history (slave trade, slavery, abolitions)
Histoire et aménagement linguistique à Saint-Barthélemy 
Saint Barth Fauna & Flora 
 General information
Saint Barthelemy. The World Factbook. Central Intelligence Agency.

Saint Barthelemy
 1